The Municipality of Bloke is a municipality in Slovenia. Originally a municipality in its own right, it was incorporated into the Municipality of Cerknica in 1955 and it was included in the Municipality of Loška Dolina in 1995, when it split from Cerknica. It was re-established as an independent municipality in 1998.

Etymology
The Municipality of Bloke is named after the karst Bloke Plateau, over which the majority of its 45 settlements are scattered. The name Bloke was first attested in written sources in 1230 as Oblach (and as Oblukch in 1260, Oblakh in 1360, and Obloc in 1581). These early transcriptions indicate that the name was originally *Obloke, probably derived from the prepositional phrase *ob(ь) lǫky or *ob(ь) lǫkaxъ 'next to the flood-meadow(s)'. Less likely theories connect the name to the meanings 'next to rough terrain' or 'arc, arch'.

Settlements
In addition to the municipal seat of Nova Vas, the municipality also includes the following settlements:

 Andrejčje
 Benete
 Bočkovo
 Fara
 Glina
 Godičevo
 Gradiško
 Hiteno
 Hribarjevo
 Hudi Vrh
 Jeršanovo
 Kramplje
 Lahovo
 Lepi Vrh
 Lovranovo
 Malni
 Metulje
 Mramorovo pri Lužarjih
 Mramorovo pri Pajkovem
 Nemška Vas na Blokah
 Ograda
 Polšeče
 Radlek
 Ravne na Blokah
 Ravnik
 Rožanče
 Runarsko
 Škrabče
 Škufče
 Sleme
 Štorovo
 Strmca
 Studenec na Blokah
 Studeno na Blokah
 Sveta Trojica
 Sveti Duh
 Topol
 Ulaka
 Velike Bloke
 Veliki Vrh
 Volčje
 Zakraj
 Zales
 Zavrh

Notable people
Ivan Čampa, poet and writer (1914, Nemška Vas na Blokah – 1942, Sveti Vid)
Jože Čampa, writer, postal clerk, researcher of rural life (1893, Benete – 1989, Ljubljana)
Anton Drobnič, lawyer, attorney general, president of the New Slovenian Covenant (1928, Bloke – 2018, Ljubljana)
Anton Hren, priest (1901, Verd – 1952, Nova Vas)
Božidar Lavrič, Tito's doctor and Partisan (1899, Nova Vas – 1961, Ljubljana)
Izidor Modic, linguist (1884, Lahovo – 1915, Renče)
Josip Podbregar, railway official and musician (1880, Velike Bloke – 1948)
Jernej Ponikvar, priest (1877, Velike Bloke – 1952, Cleveland)
Ivan Prezelj,  general in the Yugoslav Army in the Homeland and the Slovenian National Army (1895, Nova Vas – 1973, Cleveland)
Josip Prezelj, linguist, translator (1894, Nova Vas – 1969, Ljubljana)
Tone Šraj, nom de guerre Aljoša, Partisan (1912–1943)
Ernest Tomec, politician and organizer (1885, Fara, Bloke – 1942, Ljubljana)
Ivan Tomec, astronomer (1880, Fara, Bloke – 1950, Ljubljana)
Louis Tomtz, born Alojz Tomc, priest (1903, Nova Vas – 1989, Cleveland)
Janez Urbas, author of juvenile literature (1882, Volčje – 1903, Vavta Vas)
Milena Usenik, athlete and painter (born 1934, Veliki Vrh)
Iztok Winkler, forestry expert and politician (1939, Nova Vas – 2013)
Miro Zakrajšek, journalist and editor (1921, Studenec na Blokah – 1981, Ljubljana)
Miloš Zidanšek, political agitator, communist, Partisan, and People's Hero of Yugoslavia (1909, Straža na Gori pri Dramljah – 1942, Hribarjevo, Velike Bloke)
Ivan Zidar, mechanical engineer and construction entrepreneur (born 1938, Škrabče)

Gallery

References

External links

 Official site of the municipality 
 Municipality of Bloke on Geopedia

 
Bloke
1998 establishments in Slovenia